Ricardo Emir James Rayo (born May 7, 1966) is a Panamanian former footballer.

Club career
James played for local side Guabito de Bocas but never in the ANAPROF league, since he spent most of his career in Honduras playing for Platense and Olimpia. He yielded a humorous goal to Wilmer Velásquez while playing for Platense in the 1998–99 season.

He retired aged 40, after winning a 5th Honduran league title with Olimpia.

International career
James made his debut for Panama in a March 1993 UNCAF Nations Cup match against Honduras and has earned a total of 43 caps, scoring no goals. He represented his country in 17 FIFA World Cup qualification matches and played at the 1993 CONCACAF Gold Cup.

His final international was an August 2004 FIFA World Cup qualification match against El Salvador.

Retirement
After retiring, James became goalkeeping coach at Platense and later Sporting San Miguelito.

Honours and awards

Club
C.D. Platense
Liga Nacional de Fútbol Profesional de Honduras (1): 2000–01
Honduran Cup (2): 1996, 1997

C.D. Olimpia
Liga Nacional de Fútbol Profesional de Honduras (2): 2005–06 A, 2005–06 C

References

External links

 Señor Arquero, Ricardo James (Bio) – Somos Lasele 

1966 births
Living people
People from Changuinola District
Association football goalkeepers
Panamanian footballers
Panama international footballers
1993 CONCACAF Gold Cup players
1993 UNCAF Nations Cup players
2001 UNCAF Nations Cup players
2003 UNCAF Nations Cup players
Platense F.C. players
C.D. Olimpia players
Liga Nacional de Fútbol Profesional de Honduras players
Panamanian expatriate footballers
Expatriate footballers in Honduras